Abu Sa'id Al-Mufaddal ibn Muhammad ibn Ibrahim al-Janadi (died 920) was an Islamic scholar and muhaddith from Mecca.

Works 
 Faḍāʼil Makkah, The Virtues of Mecca
 Faḍāʼil al-Madīnah, The Virtues of Medina: a small treatise that referenced 78 hadiths and athar.

References 

Hadith scholars
Hadith compilers
10th-century Muslim scholars of Islam
Sunni imams
Sunni Muslim scholars of Islam
Year of birth unknown
920 deaths